José Peña may refer to:

José Enrique Peña (born 1963), Uruguayan footballer
José Ángel Peña (born 1994), Salvadoran footballer
José Enrique de la Peña (1807–1840), colonel in the Mexican Army
José Francisco Peña Gómez (1937–1998), politician from the Dominican Republic
José Peña (steeplechaser) (born 1987), Venezuelan steeplechase athlete
José María Peña (1895–1988), Spanish professional association football player
José Peña (Bolivian footballer) (born 1968), Bolivian football manager and former player
José Peña (pitcher) (born 1942), former Mexican pitcher in Major League Baseball
José Peña (sprinter) (born 1979), Venezuelan track and field sprinter
José Peña Suazo (born 1967), Dominican Republican Latin singer

See also
List of people with surname Peña